Variance is the third album by the electronic musician, Jega, released on 20 July 2009 by Planet Mu.

Track listing

References

External links
Variance at the Planet Mu website

2009 albums
Jega (musician) albums
Planet Mu albums